Swapan Bhattacharjee (born 2 February 1952) is a Bangladesh Awami League politician and the incumbent Jatiya Sangsad member from Jessore-5 constituency since January 2014. His brother Pijush Kanti Bhattacharjee is a former member of parliament.

Career
Bhattacharjee was elected to Jatiya Sangsad on 5 January 2014 from Jessore-5 as an independent candidate. He defeated the incumbent Bangladesh Awami League candidate Khan Tipu Sultan by more than 20 thousand votes.

References

Living people
1952 births
People from Jessore District
Independent politicians in Bangladesh
State Ministers of Local Government, Rural Development and Co-operatives
10th Jatiya Sangsad members
11th Jatiya Sangsad members
Bangladeshi Hindus